Acanthocercus phillipsii, Philipps's ridgeback agama, is a species of lizard in the family Agamidae. It is a small lizard found in Eritrea, Ethiopia, and Somalia.

References

Acanthocercus
Reptiles described in 1895
Taxa named by George Albert Boulenger